IWCA may refer to:

Independent Working Class Association, a left-wing political party in Britain
International Wing Chun Academy, a martial arts school in Australia
International Window Cleaning Association, a professional trade association of Window Cleaning company owners
International Wineries for Climate Action, a collaborative working group of environmentally committed wineries taking a science-based approach to reducing carbon emissions across the wine industry